Jasaw Chan Kʼawiil II also known as Stela 11 Ruler, (fl. 869), was an ajaw of the Maya city of Tikal. He ruled  869. The monuments associated with Jasaw Chan Kʼawiil II are: Stela 11 and Altar 11.

Reigning at a time when Tikal had already declined as a regional and political power, Jasaw Chan Kʼawiil is Tikal's last-known ruler identifiable from extant inscriptions. His only known monument is a stela and its accompanying altar, with an inscription bearing the latest date of any yet recovered and deciphered in Tikal. Labelled as Stela 11, the monument is the only one from the Terminal Classic period found at Tikal, and contains a Mesoamerican Long Count calendar date of 10.2.0.0.0 3 Ajaw 3 Kej, correlating to August 15, 869 in the proleptic Gregorian calendar.

Notes

Footnotes

References
 

Rulers of Tikal
9th century in the Maya civilization
9th-century monarchs in North America
9th century in Guatemala